The 2014 congressional election in Montana was held on November 4, 2014, to elect the U.S. representative from Montana's at-large congressional district. Between 1993 and 2023, Montana had one at-large seat in the House.

Incumbent Republican Congressman Steve Daines was first elected in 2012. Instead of running for re-election, he successfully ran for the U.S. Senate election in 2014. Representatives are elected for two-year terms; the elected will serve in the 114th United States Congress from January 3, 2015, until January 3, 2017.

Republican primary

Candidates

Declared
 Elsie Arntzen, state representative
 Matt Rosendale, state senator
 Corey Stapleton, former state senator and candidate for governor in 2012
 Drew Turiano, real estate investor and candidate for Secretary of State of Montana in 2012
 Ryan Zinke, former state senator and candidate for lieutenant governor in 2012

Withdrew
 Brad Johnson, former Secretary of State of Montana (running for Montana Public Service Commission)

Declined
 Steve Daines, incumbent U.S. Representative (running for the U.S. Senate)
 Champ Edmunds, state representative (running for the U.S. Senate)
 Denny Rehberg, former U.S. Representative, former lieutenant governor and nominee for the U.S. Senate in 1996 and 2012
 Scott Reichner, state representative
 Jon Sonju, state senator and nominee for lieutenant governor in 2012

Polling

Primary results

Democratic primary

Candidates

Declared
 John Driscoll, former Public Service Commissioner, former Speaker of the Montana House of Representatives and nominee for the seat in 2008
 John Lewis, former state director for U.S. Senator Max Baucus

Withdrew
 Melinda Gopher, writer and candidate for the seat in 2010

Declined
 Pam Bucy, Montana Commissioner of Labor and Industry and nominee for Attorney General of Montana in 2012
 Shane Colton, attorney and former commissioner of the Montana Department of Fish, Wildlife and Parks
 Amanda Curtis, state representative
 John Engen, Mayor of Missoula
 Kim Gillan, state senator and nominee for the seat in 2012
 Denise Juneau, Montana Superintendent of Public Instruction
 Jesse Laslovich, former state senator, Chief Legal Counsel to Montana State Auditor Monica Lindeen and candidate for Attorney General of Montana in 2012
 Monica Lindeen, Montana State Auditor
 Kendall Van Dyk, state senator
 John Walsh, United States Senator former Lieutenant Governor of Montana and former Adjutant General of the Montana National Guard (running for the U.S. Senate)
 Carol Williams, former Majority Leader of the Montana State Senate
 John Patrick Williams, former U.S. Representative
 Whitney Williams, former director of operations for Hillary Clinton
 Franke Wilmer, state representative

Endorsements

Primary results

Libertarian nomination

Candidates

Declared
 Mike Fellows, businessman and chair of the Libertarian Party of Montana

Independents

Candidates

Withdrawn
 Shawn White Wolf, counselor for the Montana United Indian Association and candidate for the Montana House of Representatives in 2010

General election

Polling

Results

See also
 United States Senate election in Montana, 2014
 2014 United States House of Representatives elections
 2014 United States elections

References

External links
 U.S. House elections in Montana, 2014 at Ballotpedia
 Campaign contributions at OpenSecrets

Official campaign websites
 John Lewis for Congress
 Ryan Zinke for Congress

United States House of Representatives
Montana
2014